Carl Albert Ruiz (April 4, 1975 – September 21, 2019), also known as Carl "The Cuban" Ruiz, was an American restaurant owner and celebrity chef, best known as a judge on various US cooking competition television series on Food Network, such as Guy's Grocery Games.

Early life 

Ruiz was born on April 4, 1975, in Passaic, New Jersey, to Yezzid and Elisa Ruiz. His father was Colombian and his mother Cuban. His brother George credits their mother and grandmother's cooking for inspiring Carl. He attended the Collegiate School. He was a classically-trained chef who graduated from the Institute of Culinary Education, in New York City.

Career

Ruiz worked as a sous chef at Dish, a restaurant in Clifton, New Jersey, before being hired as executive chef at Sabor in North Bergen, New Jersey circa 2002. In July 2002,  he was hired by the new owner of Stephen's Cafe of North Bergen as a consulting chef for a relaunch of the operation. Ruiz relocated to New York City as the first decade of the 21st century came to a close, working as an executive chef at Son Cubano, a short-lived Cuban restaurant on West 27th Street in Manhattan. The 80-seat restaurant featured live Cuban music and a night club atmosphere.

By 2011, Ruiz was executive chef at Brick Oven in Morristown, New Jersey. Together with his then wife, Marie Riccio, on October 10, 2011, Ruiz opened an Italian deli and cafe, Marie's Italian Specialties, in the Hickory Square Mall in Chatham Township, New Jersey. This cafe was memorably referred to by one food reviewer as "the type of deli you might have visited as a child when visiting your grandmother's house — if your grandmother lived in Hoboken or Jersey City in the 1950s."

It was through this restaurant, and its distinctive food, that Ruiz first made the acquaintance of celebrity chef Guy Fieri. Fieri filmed an episode of his popular Food Network television show Diners, Drive-Ins and Dives featuring Marie's Italian Specialties in October 2012, with an initial air date of January 21, 2013. Fieri would ultimately feature the restaurant twice on the show, boosting the popularity of the nine table deli as well as Ruiz's professional profile.  Ruiz was later hired to be a judge on other shows starring Fieri, including Guy's Grocery Games and Guy's Ranch Kitchen.

Ruiz and Riccio subsequently divorced, with Riccio retaining Marie's Italian Specialties following the split. In June 2019, Ruiz opened a new restaurant specializing in authentic Cuban fare, called La Cubana, in the Meatpacking District of New York City. Ruiz held the position of Executive Chef at the new eatery. Through connection to his high-profile friend Fieri, Ruiz would become a frequent guest on the Sirius XM radio show Opie and Anthony and its successor, The Opie Radio Show, along with Sherrod Small and Vic Henley. Following that show's cancellation, Ruiz would continue to be a regular on the Opie Radio podcast until the time of his death.

Ruiz was well known as a judge on Guy's Grocery Games, and he also won the most as a competitor raising money as part of various tournaments. His humor and wit made him a fan favorite.

Death

Ruiz died in his sleep on Saturday, September 21, 2019, aged 44.  The cause of death was determined to be atherosclerotic cardiovascular disease. He was visiting friends in Bel Air, Maryland, when he died.

References

Further reading

 Fran Schumer, "Italian Food, the American Way," The New York Times, May 16, 2014.

External links
 
 La Cubana Restaurant official website
 Ashley Bihun, "Chef Carl Ruiz on Sobe, Food, Friends, Fans and Riding the Wave of #Ruizing!," WGN-AM Chicago, March 1, 2019. (Audio.)

1975 births
2019 deaths
American people of Cuban descent
American people of Colombian descent
American restaurateurs
Chefs from New Jersey
Chefs from New York (state)
Cuban cuisine
Institute of Culinary Education alumni
American male chefs
People from New York City
People from Passaic, New Jersey